Gerald Messadié (1931 – 5 July 2018) was a French scientific journalist, essayist and novelist. His work comprised historical novels, biographies, essays on the history of religions, and some science fiction work where esoterism takes a large place.

Biography
Gerald Messadié was an editor of science magazine Science & Vie, for 25 years, and has published over 60 books on various themes. Interested in history, ethnology and theology, he published essays on beliefs, cultures and religions, biographies (including a two-volume biography of Moses) and historical novels, such as Marie-Antoinette – La rose écrasée (Marie-Antoinette: The Crushed Rose, 2006), aimed at rehabilitating the queen, whom he considered slandered and misrepresented.

Publications
 Un personnage sans couronne, (roman), Plon 1955
 Les princes, (roman), Plon 1957
 Le chien de francfort, (roman), Plon 1961
 Le zodiaque à 24 signes, Stock 1973
 Bouillon de culture, Robert Laffont 1973 (en collaboration avec Bruno Lussato)
 Mahomet, (religion), 1974
 L’alimentation suicide. (Les dangers réels et imaginaires des produits chimiques dans notre alimentation.) Fayard 1973
 La messe de saint Picasso, (essai), Robert Laffont 1984
 Les grandes découvertes de la science, (histoire), Bordas 1987
 Les grandes inventions de l’humanité jusqu’en 1850, (histoire), Bordas 1988
 Requiem pour Superman, la crise du mythe américain, (essai), Robert Laffont 1988
 Suite romanesque: L'Homme qui devint Dieu Tome 1 : Le récit, Robert Laffont, 1988 (Réédition : 887 pp., LGF - Livre de Poche, N° 6777, 1990 — )
 Tome 2 : Les sources, Robert Laffont, 1989 (2e édition : 1999 — )
 Tome 3 : L'incendiaire, vie de Saul, apôtre, Robert Laffont, 1991 — 
 Tome 4 : Jésus de Srinagar, Robert Laffont, 1995 (Réédition : 527 pp., LGF - Livre de Poche, 1997 — ) "roman foisonnant de personnages et de péripéties"
 Les grandes inventions du monde moderne, (histoire), Bordas 1989
 Matthias et le diable, (roman), Robert Laffont 1990
 Le chant des poissons-lunes, (roman), Robert Laffont 1992
 Ma vie amoureuse et criminelle avec Martin Heidegger, (roman), Robert Laffont 1992
 Histoire générale du diable, (religion), Robert Laffont 1993
 Coup de gueule contre les gens qui se croient de droite et quelques autres qui se croient de gauche, (nouvelle), Ramsay 1995
 29 jours avant la fin du monde, (roman), Robert Laffont 1995
 La fortune d'Alexandrie, (roman), Lattès 1996
 Tycho l’admirable, (roman), Julliard 1996
 Une histoire générale de Dieu (essai), Robert Laffont, 1997 — 
 Suite: Moïse, (biographie),
 Tome 1 : Un prince sans couronne, 320 pp., Lattès, 1998 — 
 Tome 2 : Le prophète fondateur, 373 pp., Lattès, 1998 — 
 Histoire générale de l'antisémitisme (essai), 431 pp., Lattès, 1999 — 
 David roi (roman), 380 pp., Lattès, 1999 — 
 Balzac, une conscience insurgée,écrit avec Jean-Charles Gérard, (essai), Edition N°1 1999
 Mon petit livre des prières, (religion), Presses du Châtelet 2000
 Madame Socrate, (roman policier), Lattès 2000  (Réédition : LGF - Livre de Poche, N° 15354, 2002 — )
 Les Cinq livres secrets dans la Bible (essai), 689 pp., Lattès, 2001 — 
 25, rue Soliman Pacha (roman), Lattès 2001 - 474 pp., Collection Ldp, N° 5554, LGF - Livre de Poche, 2003 — 
 Le mauvais esprit, (essai), Max Milo 2001
 Mourir pour New York, (essai), Max Milo, 2002
 L'Affaire Marie Madeleine (document), Lattés, 2002 (Réédition : LGF - Livre de Poche, N° 30187, 2004 — )
 Le tourisme va mal, achevons-le ! (essai), 2003
 Suite romanesque: Jeanne de l'Estoille
 Tome 1: La Rose et le lys, L'Archipel, 2003 — 
 Tome 2: Le Jugement des loups, L'Archipel, 2003 — 
 Tome 3: La Fleur d'Amérique , L'Archipel, 2003 — 
 Trois mille lunes, (roman), Laffont, 2003
 Suite romanesque: Orages sur le Nil
Tome I : L'oeil de Néfertiti, L’Archipel 2004
 Tome II : Les masques de Toutankhamon, L’Archipel 2004
 Tome III : Le triomphe de Seth, L’Archipel 2004
 Et si c'était lui (roman), 350 pp., L'Archipel, 2004 — 
 Suite: Saint Germain l'homme qui ne voulait pas mourir
 Tome I : Le masque venu de nulle part, (ou "Un masque nommé Saint Germain"), L’Archipel, 2005
 Tome II : Les puissances de l'invisible, L’Archipel, 2005 - 
 Cargo, la religion des humiliés du Pacifique (essai), Calmann-Levy, 2005, 
 Marie-Antoinette — La rose écrasée (roman), L'Archipel, 2006 — 
 Quarante siècles d'ésotérisme (essai), Presses du Chatelet, 2006, 
 Judas, le bien-aimé, Lattès 2007
 Suite: Jacob
 Tome I : Le gué de Yabboq, L’Archipel, 2007
 Tome II : Le roi sans couronne, L’Archipel, 2007
 Saladin, chevalier de l’islam, (document), L’Archipel, 2008
 Padre Pio ou les prodiges du mysticisme, (religion), Presses du Châtelet 2008
 Jurassic France : pourquoi nous sommes en voie de fossilisation, L'Archipel, 2009
 Un espoir aussi fort
Tome I : Les années de fer, L’Archipel, 2009
Tome II : Les années d'argent, L’Archipel, 2009
Tome III : Les années d'or, L’Archipel, 2009
 Le Krach du sperme, avec Pierre Duterte, L’Archipel, 2009
 Ramsès II l’immortel
Tome I : Le Diable flamboyant, L’Archipel, 2010
Tome II : Le Roi des millions d’années, L’Archipel, 2010

References

1931 births
2018 deaths
20th-century French historians
Science journalists
French journalists
21st-century French writers
French biographers
French essayists
Writers from Cairo